Conus goudeyi is a species of sea snail, a marine gastropod mollusc in the family Conidae, the cone snails, cone shells or cones.

These snails are predatory and venomous. They are capable of "stinging" humans.

Description
The size of the shell varies between 30 mm and 45 mm.

Distribution
This marine species occurs off New Caledonia.

References

 E. Monnier & L. Limpalaër (2012): Phasmoconus goudeyi (Gastropoda: Conidae) a New Species from New Caledonia - Visaya Vol. 3 n°5.
 Puillandre N., Duda T.F., Meyer C., Olivera B.M. & Bouchet P. (2015). One, four or 100 genera? A new classification of the cone snails. Journal of Molluscan Studies. 81: 1-23

External links
 To World Register of Marine Species
 

goudeyi
Gastropods described in 2012